Ploskovo is a rural locality (a village) in Chushevitskoye Rural Settlement, Verkhovazhsky District, Vologda Oblast, Russia. The population was 359 as of 2002. There are 10 streets.

Geography 
Ploskovo is located 45 km southwest of Verkhovazhye (the district's administrative centre) by road. Bereg is the nearest rural locality.

References 

Rural localities in Verkhovazhsky District